The 1997 Australian Individual Speedway Championship was held at the Brisbane Exhibition Ground in Brisbane, Queensland on 28 December 1996. This was the final time (as of 2014) that the "Ekka" has hosted an Australian Solo Championship.

Defending champion Craig Boyce won his third and final Australian Championship, once again scoring a 15-point maximum from his five rides. Jason Crump finished second for the second straight year after defeating South Australian Champion Ryan Sullivan and former three time national champion Leigh Adams in a runoff when all three riders finished on 13 points.

1997 Australian Solo Championship
 Australian Championship
 28 December 1996
  Brisbane, Queensland - Brisbane Exhibition Ground
 Referee: 
 Qualification: The top four riders go through to the Overseas Final in Bradford, England.

References

See also
 Australia national speedway team
 Sport in Australia

Speedway in Australia
Australia
Individual Speedway Championship